Naposhteh (also Romanized as Nāposhteh; also known as Nefishta) is a village in Misheh Pareh Rural District, in the Central District of Kaleybar County, East Azerbaijan Province, Iran. At the 2006 census, its population was 45, in 11 families.

References 

Populated places in Kaleybar County